The Barrie Baycats are an independent, minor league baseball team of the semi-pro Intercounty Baseball League based in Barrie, Ontario. They play their home games at Vintage Throne Stadium at the Barrie Community Sports Complex in Midhurst.

2021 roster

Pitchers
Juan Benitez
Jaspreet Shergill
Andrew Grieder 
Chris Cox
Brad Grieveson
Brandon Hillier
Marshall Leishman
Max Lojko 
Kevin Millar
Evan Soules
Riley Hoover
Mason Robertson 
Christian Mullen
Aidan Rossel
Lucas Earle

Catchers
Jake MacDonald
Tyler Plumpton

Infielders
Ryan Rijo
Mike Cecchetto
Branfy Infante 
Royce Ando
Marcell Lacasse
Owen Jansen
Darius Barlas
Carson Burns

Outfielders
Jeff Cowan
Jake Wilson
David LeBlanc
Avery Tuck
Noel McGarry-Doyle
Kenny Di Clemente
James Anderson

Season-by-season records
YEAR: 2001, RECORD: 13-19, SEEDING: 7th, FINISH: Out of Playoffs 
YEAR: 2002, RECORD: 19-17, SEEDING: 4th, FINISH: Lost Semi-Final to Toronto 
YEAR: 2003, RECORD: 15-21, SEEDING: 8th, FINISH: Out of Playoffs 
YEAR: 2004, RECORD: 20-16, SEEDING: 4th, FINISH: Lost Quarter-Final to Guelph 
YEAR: 2005, RECORD: 21-15, SEEDING: 3rd, FINISH: Won Championship against Toronto 
YEAR: 2006, RECORD: 26-10, SEEDING: 1st, FINISH: Lost Semi-Final to London 
YEAR: 2007, RECORD: 17-19, SEEDING: 5th, FINISH: Lost Quarter-Final to Guelph 
YEAR: 2008, RECORD: 24 12, SEEDING: 3rd, FINISH: Lost Quarter-Final to Oshawa 
YEAR: 2009, RECORD: 26 10, SEEDING: 1st, FINISH: Lost Final to Brantford 
YEAR: 2010, RECORD: 21-5, SEEDING: 3rd, FINISH: Lost Final to Brantford 
YEAR: 2011, RECORD: 26-9, SEEDING: 1st, FINISH: Lost Semi-Final to Ottawa 
YEAR: 2012, RECORD: 21-15, SEEDING: 3rd, FINISH: Lost Final to Brantford 
YEAR: 2013, RECORD: 25-17, SEEDING: 3rd, FINISH: Lost Final to Brantford 
YEAR: 2014, RECORD: 30-6, SEEDING: 1st, FINISH: Won Championship against London 
YEAR: 2015, RECORD: 28-7, SEEDING: 1st, FINISH: Won Championship against Kitchener
YEAR: 2016, RECORD: 25-11, SEEDING: 3rd, FINISH: Won Championship against Toronto 
YEAR: 2017, RECORD: 33-3, SEEDING: 1st, FINISH: Won Championship against Kitchener
YEAR: 2018, RECORD: 27-8, SEEDING: 1st, FINISH: Won Championship against Kitchener
YEAR: 2019, RECORD: 26-11, SEEDING: 1st, FINISH: Won Championship against Kitchener
YEAR: 2020, Did not play due to COVID-19
YEAR: 2021, RECORD: 14-16, SEEDING: 5th, FINISH: Lost Semi-Final to Toronto

Team accomplishments
Championships: (7) (2005, 2014, 2015, 2016, 2017, 2018 and 2019)
Pennants: (7) (2006, 2009, 2011, 2014, 2015, 2017 and 2018)
Best Regular-Season Win Percentage in Team History: .917 in 2017 (Intercounty Baseball League Record)
Most Regular-Season Wins in Team History: 33 in 2017 (Ties An Intercounty Baseball League Record)
Fewest Regular-Season Losses in Team History: 3 in 2017 (Ties an Intercounty Baseball League Record)
Best Start in Team History: 26-0 in 2017 (Intercounty Baseball League Record)
Longest Win Streak in Team History: 35 in 2016/Continued into 2017 (Intercounty Baseball League Record)
Did Not Lose a Regular-Season Home Game Throughout the Entire 2017 Regular-Season
Did Not Lose a Playoff Game Throughout the Entire 2017 Postseason

Top 100 IBL Players
P Angus Roy (02-09)
P Brad Bissell (02-19)
INF Frankie Hare (2011)
OF Glenn Jackson (06-11, 15-19)
INF Jordan Castaldo (13-19)
DH Kevin Hinton (2011)
C Kyle DeGrace (12-19)
P Paul Spoljaric (08-11)
OF Ryan Spataro (05-Present)
1B Sean Reilly (2011)

Honoured Baycats
P Chris England (2016)
C Matt Proctor (2017)
INF David Latour (2016)
INF Jared McCord (2016)
INF Ryan Davis (2017)

Alumni currently playing Minor League Baseball

Claudio Custodio (2017), Baltimore Orioles Organization
C Anthony Quirion (2021), the Philadelphia Phillies Organization (Signed with the Phillies before he played a game for the Baycats)

General managers
Gary Calvert, 2001-2005; 2008
Brad Graham, 2006-2007
Larry Sutton, 2009-2010
Kevin Hinton, 2011
Doug Dimma, 2012-2013
Angus Roy, 2014–2019
Josh Matlow, 2020–present

Field managers
Nick Owen, 2001-2004
Jeff Sharpe, 2005-2006
Angus Roy, 2007–2019
Josh Matlow, 2020–present

External links
 Barrie Baycats' Web site

Baseball teams established in 2001
Baseball teams in Ontario
Intercounty Baseball League
Sport in Barrie